The 2018 Rome escalator accident was an incident where twenty-four people, mostly fans of the CSKA Moscow Football team, were injured after a crowded escalator at a Rome Metro station malfunctioned and suddenly sped up and hurled people down the escalator.

Incident 
The escalator at the Repubblica Metro station in Rome malfunctioned on 23 October. The station was crowded due to many fans traveling to the Rome Olympic stadium to watch a Champions League game between CSKA Moscow and AS Roma. Witnesses claimed a group of CSKA fans going down into the station were jumping and singing before the incident. The escalator suddenly sped up with little time for those at the bottom to get out of the way.

Some fans attempted to escape by utilizing the median to either slide down, or get to the other escalator. After the escalator was stopped, a photo was released of the escalator stairs crumpled at the bottom with jagged and exposed metal plates.

Victims 
Seven people were reported to have been seriously injured, with varying accounts of the total amount of injured. Some of the injured were trapped between the metal plates of the steps at the bottom of the escalator.

Aftermath 
Rome Mayor Virginia Raggi issued a request for a formal inquest over the cause of the malfunction. The entire Repubblica station was closed so that investigators and firefighters could carry out all investigations and rescue operations. In the week following the accident protests against Raggi, and raised concerns about her failing to address the city's issues such as the accident and lack of funds for city upkeep and infrastructure.

A representative from ATAC, Rome's public transport company, issued a statement that "all maintenance checks of the escalator were carried out regularly and the results were in accordance to the norms." Police after studying the accident footage concluded that the fans were not jumping on the escalator. The CSKA fans released a statement on 24 October that; "Italian officials, without conducting an investigation, were quick to accuse us of the accident. Apparently, they are trying to shun the responsibility of what happened."

References 

Accidents in Europe
2018 in Italy
2010s in Rome
Rome Metro
October 2018 events in Europe
2018 disasters in Italy